Al Hachi is a Kashmiri cultivar of pumpkin.

Use
The people of Kashmir dry Al Hachi pumpkins to eat in the winter, when snowfall can isolate the valley. Fresh pumpkins are cut into slices and let them to dry in sunlight. Al Hachi can be cooked with Mutton, Rajma daal, and with other dry Kashmiri vegetable Ragawan Hachi (Dry Tomato).

References

Indian cuisine
Pakistani cuisine
Squashes and pumpkins